Propaganda in Germany may refer to:
 Propaganda in Nazi Germany
 Propaganda in East Germany